Nathan Nnamdi Ugochukwu Benjamin Asigboro Ofoborh (born 7 November 1999) is a professional footballer who plays as a midfielder for Rangers. Born in England, Ofoborh represents Nigeria internationally.

Career

Youth career
Ofoborh started his youth career at Millwall before deciding to take up an apprenticeship with the Cherries in July 2016, having impressed during a trial spell, and enjoyed a fruitful two-year term with the club’s under-18s, including captaining them in his second year and being named Young Player of the Season in 2017–18.

Having signed his first professional deal in July 2017, Ofoborh was rewarded with a new contract in December 2018, tying him to the club until 2021.

AFC Bournemouth
After re-signing with the club in December 2018, Ofoborh appeared on the bench for two Premier League games in the 2018–19 season, including the 1–0 home loss to Fulham on 20 April, and a 1–0 home win against Tottenham Hotspur on 4 May. Having trained regularly with Eddie Howe’s first-team squad, Ofoborh started pre-season friendlies against AFC Wimbledon, Girona and West Bromwich Albion in 2019, including an impressive 3–0 win against Lyon.

2019–20 season: Loan to Wycombe Wanderers
On 2 September 2019, Ofoborh joined Wycombe Wanderers on a season-long loan. He made his professional debut in Wycombe's league game against Lincoln City on 8 September 2019. He scored his first professional goal for Wycombe in an EFL Trophy tie against Milton Keynes Dons on 12 November 2019. Ofoborh then went on to score his first league goal for Wycombe Wanderers in a EFL League One play-off semi final against Fleetwood Town on 3 July 2020. Ofoborh started in the League One Play-Off Final for Wycombe on 13 July, playing 62 minutes as Wycombe overcame Oxford United 2–1 to win promotion to the second tier of English football for the first time in their history.

2020–21 season: Return to Bournemouth
Following Bournemouth's relegation from the Premier League to the Championship, Ofoborh returned to the squad for the 2020–21 season. He played in a pre-season friendly game against Benfica on 29 August; a 2–1 loss. He made his competitive debut for Bournemouth in an EFL Cup tie against Crystal Palace on 15 September 2020. The game went to penalties and Ofoborh scored his effort as Bournemouth won the shootout. Ofoborh made his league debut for the club in a 3–1 away win against Coventry City, coming on as a sub in the 90th minute.

Second loan to Wycombe Wanderers
On 1 February 2021, Ofoborh returned to Wycombe Wanderers on loan until the end of the 2020–21 season.

Rangers
Ofoborh signed a four-year pre-contract agreement with Scottish club Rangers in February 2021.

International career 
Ofoborh was called up to the Nigeria U20s squad for the Under-20 World Cup finals in Poland in May–June 2019, making three appearances in the tournament. He made his debut as a substitute in a 4–0 win over Qatar in their opening group game before starting in a 1–1 draw with Ukraine as the Flying Eagles advanced to the knockout stage. Ofoborh also started the round of 16 defeat by Senegal in Łódź.

Career statistics

Honours
Wycombe Wanderers
EFL League One play-offs: 2020

Individual
AFC Bournemouth U-21 Player of the Year: 2018
Wycombe Wanderers Goal of the Season: 2019–20

References

External links

1999 births
Living people
Footballers from Southwark
Citizens of Nigeria through descent
Nigerian footballers
Nigeria under-20 international footballers
English footballers
English people of Nigerian descent
Association football midfielders
AFC Bournemouth players
Wycombe Wanderers F.C. players
English Football League players